Piano Sonata in B minor may refer to:

 Piano Sonata No. 3 (Chopin)
 Piano Sonata in B minor (Liszt)
 Piano Sonata No. 2 (Shostakovich)
 Piano Sonata in B minor (Strauss)